Ingeborg Renner (born 2 August 1946) is a German former swimmer. She competed in two events at the 1968 Summer Olympics.

References

1946 births
Living people
German female swimmers
Olympic swimmers of West Germany
Swimmers at the 1968 Summer Olympics
Sportspeople from Erfurt